Sarah Ann Elsom ( Read, 26 March 1867 – 17 November 1962) was a New Zealand florist.

Biography 
Elsom was born in Dunedin, New Zealand, the daughter of Elizabeth Martin and her husband, William Read. Read was a gardener, seedsman, florist and fern collector. The family later changed the spelling of their surname to Reid. 

In 1897, when Elsom was 30, she moved to Christchurch and established a successful floristry business in High Street called A. & S. Reid. 

In March 1902 she married Edwin Elsom, a seedsman.

References

1867 births
1962 deaths
Florists
Businesspeople from Dunedin
19th-century New Zealand businesswomen
19th-century New Zealand businesspeople
20th-century New Zealand businesswomen
20th-century New Zealand businesspeople